Ruhs or RUHS may refer to:
 Kris Ruhs (born 1952), American painter and sculptor
 Rajasthan University of Health Sciences, a state university in Jaipur, Rajasthan, India
 Redford Union High School, Redford, Michigan, United States
 Redondo Union High School, Redondo Beach, California, United States